Spragueia funeralis is a species of bird dropping moth in the family Noctuidae first described by Augustus Radcliffe Grote in 1881. It is found in North America.

References

Further reading

External links
 

Acontiinae
Articles created by Qbugbot
Moths described in 1881
Moths of North America